Heaven is a 2022 Indian Malayalam-language crime thriller film co-written and directed by Unni Govindraj (in his directorial debut). The film stars Suraj Venjaramoodu, with Alencier Ley Lopez, Vinaya Prasad, and Sudheesh in important roles. The film's music was composed by Gopi Sundar. Heaven was released theatrically on 17 July 2022.

Plot 
In a camping trip, a group of NCC cadets finds a decomposed body in the woods. DYSP Bijoy Kuruvilla, the investigating officer finds that the murderer is a CI named Peter Kurishinkal and arrests him. Peter Kurishinkal is a widowed brain-over-brawn cop, who lives with his mother Mariyam and son Sebin. The cops are investigating a mass murder of Mathew's family, where Peter discovers that Sebin is also murdered. DYSP Kishore finds that a migrant worker, who used to work at their home has absconded and is the prime suspect. Peter notices that the tapes tied on victims hands are tied anti-clockwise, which makes him deduce that a left-handed person should have done the crime. The migrant worker was right handed. Peter regains his job as he wants to find the perpetrators, who murdered Sebin. Later he finds the migrant workers body from the same house buried under the tiles. Peter also finds blood stains on the floor and looks for patients, who received treatment on that day for similar injuries and arrests Stephen. Peter finds that Stephen received money for confessing to the crime and learns about his advocate. 

While following the advocate, Peter learns that Kishore is also involved in the crime, where he interrogates Kishore. Kishore tells Stephen that the murders were done in vengeance by Fabian John. Fabian was smuggling diamonds via air which Mathews found out and informed the customs. Fabian's wife, who is pregnant, was the carrier, due to which she loses her child and commits suicide. Fabian learns about Mathews and arrives at Mathew's home named Heaven with Stephen and Ubaid to kill him. While killing Mathew's family, Sebin happens to reach the spot and Fabian had to kill him too. Peter digs out Fabian's wife's grave and Fabian arrives at Heaven to kill Peter. A fight ensues, where Peter kills Fabian by injecting air into his veins, where he keeps the body in a morgue for a while and instructs an ambulance driver Philip to wear his clothes and drop the body in the woods, while Peter leaves to Dubai and video tapes him attending a birthday function. During the court trial, Peter could prove that he was in Dubai during the time of the murder occurred as per post-mortem report. Due to this, Peter is released from custody.

Cast

Release 
Heaven released in theaters on 17 July 2022 and subsequently was released on Disney+ Hotstar on 19 August 2022. The Hindi dubbed version is available on Hulu.

Reception 
Avinash Ramachandran of Cinema Express wrote that "Heaven is a decent film that could have been either better or worse, and it is to the credit of the team that it stays safely on the better side of things". Sanjith Sidhardhan of OTT Play gave the film a rating of two-and-a-half out of five stars and opined that "While the first half is interesting with just enough twists and red herrings, the filmmaker loses the grip in the second half by piecing together a puzzle that doesn’t quite fit into how the film was progressing".

References

External links 
 

2022 films
Indian crime thriller films
2020s Malayalam-language films